Paul Marie Eugène Vieille (2 September 1854 – 14 January 1934) was a French chemist who invented modern nitrocellulose-based smokeless gunpowder in 1884. He was a graduate of Ecole Polytechnique.

Impact
The new smokeless powder, called Poudre B, was three times as powerful as black powder for the same weight and left virtually no residues of combustion. Paul Vieille soon became director of the "Laboratoire Central des Poudres et Salpetres" in Paris, where his research had taken place. His invention was applied not only to small arms but also to the full range of artillery ammunition. His invention was widely followed within a short time by all the major military powers. Vieille received the Prix Leconte (₣50,000) in 1889 in recognition of his discovery. Veille was a member  of the French Academy of Sciences.

References

1854 births
1934 deaths
19th-century French chemists
19th-century French inventors
Members of the French Academy of Sciences